Oyinda is an English singer, songwriter and record producer, based in New York City. According to Clash, she "specialises in emotive, husky, down beat pop music. There's an R&B side to her delivery, with Oyinda seeming to pour her being into each word." Her first two singles, "Rush of You" and "What Still Remains", were released in 2014. Rolling Stone named her one of Lollapalooza's "50 Must-See Acts" in 2014, calling her "R&B's best kept secret."

Early life
Oyinda is the youngest daughter of Nigerian politicians Bola Tinubu and Oluremi Tinubu.

Education
Oyinda earned a degree from Berklee College of Music in 2013.

Music career

2014: "Rush of You"
Released early in 2014 and digitally on 24 July 2014, Oyinda's debut single was "Rush of You". Oyinda both produced and handled vocals. About "Rush of You", The 405 wrote, "The plush, electro sequenced track bridges delicate harmonies and deft hypnotic production akin to a more poppy version of Young Fathers." The magazine DIY wrote that the single consists of "track circuits barely-there, showy guitar solos and looped, flickering vocals on a journey that's led by thumping piano notes (think Massive Attack with an even greater freedom to roam) and the Londoner's glue-like vocals. They piece together a heady mix of drifting ideas... This song is devoted to her masterful sense of control."

2014: "What Still Remains"

Her second single, "What Still Remains", was released on 9 April 2014. Clash described her vocal delivery as "a devastating performance... a hushed, moody vocal take matched against a gossamer arrangement."

The single was released again in September 2014. Pigeons and Planes called the track a "blend of string instruments and pulsating electronic elements similar to bringing together the old world with the new—paired with her nostalgia-drenched vocals." DIY wrote that "Beyond synth sobs and fatal chimes, there's a simple but affecting string line breaking out in the background.This being her second track to date, the Nigerian singer's already proving a dab hand at making emotionally-led pop sound like something vital, not just an exercise in expression."

2014: Lollapalooza
Her first significant gig was at Lollapalooza on 3 August 2014, where she was an opening act in Chicago. Rolling Stone named her one of Lollapalooza's "50 Must-See Acts", calling her "R&B's best kept secret."

Musical style
Oyinda's music has been described as R&B and electronic soul. Clash wrote that she "specialises in emotive, husky, down beat pop music. There's an R&B side to her delivery, with Oyinda seeming to pour her being into each word."

Discography

Extended plays

Singles

References

Further reading

External links
 

Year of birth missing (living people)
Living people
21st-century Black British women singers
British contemporary R&B singers
English expatriates in the United States
English women singer-songwriters
English people of Nigerian descent
Singers from London